Gono University or Gono Bishwabidyalay (abbreviated as GB) is a private university in Savar, Bangladesh which was established on 14 July 1994. It is now operating their academic and administrating activity on their permanent campus at Nolam, Savar, Dhaka. It was approved by University Grants Commission (UGC) on 1998. Professor Dr. Md. Abul Hossain is the vice-chancellor of the university.

History 
Gono University was founded by the non profit Gonoshasthaya Kendra in 1994.

In December 2013, students of Gono University and its sister medical university, Gonoshasthaya Samaj Vittik Medical College, vandalized their own university and hospital over the death of a doctor of the institute in remote area of Patuakhali. Gonoshasthaya Kendra requires the students and doctors to work in 46 health care centres located in remote rural parts of Bangladesh.

University Grant Commission identified Gono University as one of number of Universities with Vice-Chancellors in September 2015 report; the last Vice-Chancellor recently finished his tenure. On 12 September 2015, students of Gono University blocked Dhaka-Aricha highway protesting the government decision to impose vat on private university tuitions.

Students of Gono University got into scuffles with protestors outside PHA building of the Gonoshasthaya Kendra in 2018. The protestors were laid by plaintiffs of cases against the founder of Gonoshasthaya Kendra, Zafrullah Chowdhury, who alleged the building was built on land that belonged to Cotton Textile Craft Limited.

In December 2017, students of Gono University protested in Savar demanding University Grants Commission recognize BBA program of the university.

The University Grant Commission issued a warning against students joining Gono University over management irregularities at the university in 2019.

On 13 September 2020, the register of Gono University was fired for sexual harassment.

Bijon Kumar Sil, lead virologist at Gono University, developed a low cost COVID-19 test kit during the COVID-19 pandemic in Bangladesh. It failed to secure approval from the government of Bangladesh and Sil, a citizen of Singapore, was forced to leave Bangladesh after failing to get a renewed work permit.

Vice-chancellor 
 Professor Dr. Md. Abul Hossain

Trustee Board

Faculties

 Faculty of Health Sciences
 Faculty of Arts & Social Sciences
 Faculty of Science & Engineering
 Faculty of Veterinary and Animal sciences
 Faculty of Postgraduate Studies

References

External links
 Library GB
 Home page of Department of Pharmacy, Gono University
 (https://gonouniversity.edu.bd/microbiology/)
 Gono University in university-directory.eu
 Gono Bishwabidyalay in University Grants Commission

Private universities in Bangladesh
Educational institutions established in 1994
1994 establishments in Bangladesh
Universities and colleges in Dhaka
Gono University